Girmaw Amare (born 26 October 1987) is an Ethiopian-born Israeli runner. He competes in the 10,000 m, half marathon, marathon, and half marathon team event. He represented Israel at the 2020 Summer Olympics.

Amare attended Wingate Institute.

Early life
Amare was born in West Gojjam Zone, Ethiopia, to a family of Ethiopian-Jewish background, and immigrated to Israel with his family in 2006.

Running career
In August 2017 he represented Israel at the 2017 World Championships in Athletics, coming in 63rd in the marathon with a time of 2:26:37.

In January 2018 Amare won the 41st Sea of Galilee Tiberias International Marathon with a time of 2:15.30, the sixth-best time ever by an Israeli, and won the Israeli national championship.  In February 2018, he won the Israeli 15 km Challenge in Rishon Letzion, Israel, with a time of 44:55. In March 2018 he competed at the 2018 IAAF World Half Marathon Championships, coming in 10th in the Men's Half Marathon Team Event and 52nd in the Men's Half Marathon with a time of 1:03:19.

In February 2019, he won the Israeli 15 km Challenge in Rishon Letzion, Israel, with a time of 45:13.  In May 2019 Amare came in eighth in the Prague Marathon with a time of 2:09:54.

See also
List of Israeli records in athletics
Sports in Israel

References

External links
 
 
 

1987 births
Living people
Ethiopian Jews
Ethiopian emigrants to Israel
Citizens of Israel through Law of Return
Israeli male long-distance runners
Israeli male marathon runners
Jewish Israeli sportspeople
Olympic athletes of Israel
Israeli people of Ethiopian-Jewish descent
Sportspeople of Ethiopian descent
Athletes (track and field) at the 2020 Summer Olympics
Athletes (track and field) at the 2015 European Games
European Games medalists in athletics
European Games bronze medalists for Israel
People from Amhara Region